Sarah Loosemore (born 15 June 1971) is a retired professional tennis player from Wales. She is now a qualified solicitor.

Born in Cardiff but brought up in Dinas Powys by solicitor father John (Grandy) and tennis coach mother Pam (Nanny), Loosemore played on the WTA from the late 1980s until 1992. She was the youngest female British competitor at Wimbledon at age 17 in 1988. And before that played in junior Wimbledon for a number of years prior. In 1990, she played the 3rd round the International Australia (beaten by Helena Suková), her best performance in a Grand Slam event.

After tennis, Loosemore studied at the University of Oxford for a psychology degree. There she met Chad Lion-Cachet, a Dutch-national former Oxford University rugby union captain and a South African under 21 international.
Loosemore also presented an HTV programme in 1991 and 1992 called 'Get Going', the show involved numerous sports activities to inspire the Welsh public to get active in their spare time. The couple married and moved to Surrey, and after the birth of their first child Samuel (Sammy)in 2000 Loosemore became a full-time mother. The couple now have three children, the youngest of whom was born in 2006, and live in Oxford, while Loosemore still plays amateur tennis for South Wales.

WTA finals

Singles (1 runners-up)

ITF finals

Singles (1-1)

Doubles (1–0)

Grand Slams records

Singles

Final opponent on the right, l'ultime adversaire

Doubles

Fed Cup

She appeared in the Fed Cup in 1990, playing three singles matches and winning two.

World ranking

Notes

External links
 
 

1971 births
Alumni of the University of Oxford
Welsh female tennis players
Hopman Cup competitors
Living people
People from Oxford
Sportspeople from Cardiff
Welsh solicitors
British female tennis players